Mike Mouat (born March 20, 1954) is a Canadian former field hockey player who competed in the 1976 Summer Olympics. Mouat was born in Vancouver, British Columbia.

References

External links
 

1954 births
Living people
Field hockey players from Vancouver
Canadian male field hockey players
Olympic field hockey players of Canada
Field hockey players at the 1976 Summer Olympics
Pan American Games medalists in field hockey
Pan American Games bronze medalists for Canada
Field hockey players at the 1971 Pan American Games
Medalists at the 1971 Pan American Games